The Les Cunningham Award is given annually to American Hockey League's "Most Valuable Player" of the regular season, as voted on by AHL media and players.

The award was first presented in the 1947–48 season, is named after Les Cunningham, a five-time AHL All-Star and three-time Calder Cup champion who averaged better than a point per game over his 10-year playing career with the original Cleveland Barons. Upon his retirement, he was the AHL's career leader in points.

Winners

External links
Official AHL website
AHL Hall of Fame
Historic standings and statistics - at Internet Hockey Database

American Hockey League trophies and awards